David John Andrew (10 November 1867 – 18 November 1928) was an Australian politician. Born in Castlemaine, Victoria, he was educated at state schools before becoming an apprentice civil engineer. Later he was an auctioneer in Bendigo. He was elected to Bendigo City Council and was mayor in 1909, 1913 and 1920.

In 1925, he was elected to the Australian Senate as a Country Party senator from Victoria. He was elected to a fourth vacancy in the election, defeating Labor's Joseph Hannan, who had been appointed to fill the vacancy caused by the death of Stephen Barker.

Andrew retired in 1928 and died on 18 November that year, while still a senator. Richard Abbott was appointed to serve the remainder of his term.

References

National Party of Australia members of the Parliament of Australia
Members of the Australian Senate for Victoria
Members of the Australian Senate
Australian auctioneers
1867 births
1928 deaths
20th-century Australian politicians